Schola Antiqua was an early music group based in New York led by R. John Blackley and Barbara Katherine Jones.

Discography
Music for Holy Week / Gregorian Chant by Schola Antiqua (1990-10-25)

References

Early music groups